Paul Nebiker (died 18 March 1928) was a Swiss footballer who played for FC Basel. He played as a forward.

Football career
Nebiker joined Basel in 1923 and played for them for four seasons. During his first season he only played in three test games. He made his domestic league debut on 14 September 1924 away to Luzern. Basel won the game 1–0, but because Luzern used an ineligible player, the match was awarded to Basel as a 3–0 win. His last game for FC Basel was against Young Boys on 5 December 1926.

Between 1923 and 1926 Nebiker played ten games for Basel and scored once. Four games were in the Swiss Serie A and six were friendlies. He scored his only goal during the friendly against Olympique Lillois in France which ended as a 3–3 draw.

References

Sources
 Rotblau: Jahrbuch Saison 2017/2018. Publisher: FC Basel Marketing AG. 
 Die ersten 125 Jahre. Publisher: Josef Zindel im Friedrich Reinhardt Verlag, Basel. 
 Verein "Basler Fussballarchiv" Homepage

FC Basel players
Swiss men's footballers
Association football forwards
1928 deaths